Coprosma acerosa, commonly called sand coprosma, is a shrub that is native to New Zealand. It is a coastal plant found on the landward side of sand dunes. C. acerosa is a low, spreading shrub with yellow-brownish leaves, red bark and blue fruit.

It is declining over large parts of its original range due to competition from marram grass.

Description 
Low-growing, with slender flexible, sprawling to prostrate, interlacing branches and branchlets, forming a ± cushionlike mass up to c. 2 m. diam., occ. up to 2m. tall. Branchlets ∞ with yellowish brown bark, pubescent when young. Lvs in opp. Pairs or fascicles, on yellowish petioles. Stipules rounded-obtuse to broadly triangular, ± pubescent, ciliolate. Lamina coriac., yellowish green, linear obtuse, 7-12 × 1-1·5- (2) mm. Midrib alone evident. Fls solitary, terminal on short branchlets. ♂ with calyx 0 or vestigial; corolla funnelform, lobes ovate-oblong, subacute, ± = tube. ♀ with acute, narrow-triangular calyx-teeth; corolla funnelform, lobes narrow-oblong, obtuse. Drupe translucent, very pale to pale blue, often with darker flecks, globose, c. 7 mm. diam.

References

acerosa
Endemic flora of New Zealand
Divaricating plants
Taxa named by Allan Cunningham (botanist)